Per Johansson (born 6 April 1989) is a Swedish football player, currently playing for BK Forward. Johansson usually plays as a left wing defender. He made his Allsvenskan debut when Djurgården played against Gefle IF on 9 April 2008. He joined the Djurgården from Karlslunds IF at the start of the 2007 season. He also played for Örebro SK.

External links

1989 births
Allsvenskan players
Djurgårdens IF Fotboll players
Örebro SK players
Swedish footballers
Association football defenders
Living people
BK Forward players